Conrad I of Raabs (died 1143) was Burgrave of Nuremberg from  to  jointly with his older brother Gottfried II.  After Gottfried II died, Conrad ruled alone until his own death.

Life 
Conrad I was a member of the edelfrei von Raabs family.  He was a son of Gottfried I of Gosham and a grandson of Ulrich of Gosham, the family's ancestor, who ruled an area northwest of Melk when the House of Babenberg ruled the Margraviate of Austria.  The family takes its name from their ancestral castle in Raabs an der Thaya, which is now in Lower Austria.

In 1105, Nuremberg Castle and the city became entangled in a dispute between Emperor Henry IV and his son Henry V.  The city and castle were partially destroyed.  In order to better protect the castle and city in the future, the emperor appointed Conrad I and his brother Gottfried II as Burgmann and made them responsible for the protection of the castle, making them  burgraves.  However, their official job title was Castellan; the title  was first used by Gottfried III of Raabs.

In the following years, Conrad I acted primarily to extend his territorial base to the west of Nuremberg.  This brought him into conflict with the Bishopric of Bamberg; a document in Bamberg even calls him Conrad tyrannus.  He appears to have lived in the area west of Nuremberg during this period, and occasionally called himself "Conrad of Riedfeld", after his castle near Neustadt an der Aisch.

After his brother's death, Conrad became the sole lord of Nuremberg Castle.  After his death, he was succeeded by his nephew, Gottfried II's son, Gottfried III.

References 
 Sigmund Benker and Andraes Kraus (eds): Geschichte Frankens bis zum Ausgang des 18. Jahrhunderts, founded by Max Spindler, 3rd ed., Beck, Munich, 1997, 
 Norbert  Angermann eet al. (editor and advisor): Lexikon des Mittelalters, vol. 6, Artemis & Winkler Verlag, Munich, 1993, 

Burgraves of Nuremberg
House of Raabs
11th-century births
1140s deaths
Year of birth unknown
Year of death uncertain
12th-century German nobility